Geneviève Hasenohr (born 3 July 1942) is a French philologist and prolific scholar of medieval and Renaissance French literature. She has authored or contributed to more than forty books, written at least fifty academic articles and reviews, and prepared numerous scholarly editions.

She contributed to two of the most widely used books in the field of medieval French literature. One is Introduction à l'ancien français, by Guy Raynaud de Lage, revised by Hasenohr. With Michel Zink, she revised volume 1 of the monumental Dictionnaire des lettres françaises, subtitled Le Moyen Age. Zink and Hasenohr also co-edited the international academic journal Romania.

Her earliest publications were under the name Geneviève Esnos, then from 1969 to 2002 much of her work appeared under the name Geneviève Hasenohr-Esnos.

Long a professor at the Sorbonne university in Paris and at the Section Romane of the Institut de Recherche et d'Histoire des Textes at the Centre National de Recherche Scientifique (CNRS) in Paris, she remains affiliated with the Ecole Pratique des Hautes Etudes and the Centre de recherche sur la création littéraire en France à la Renaissance.

She has been honored as a Knight of the National Order of Merit (France), and as a Chevalier des Palmes académiques. Since the year 2000, she has been a correspondent of the Académie des Inscriptions et Belles-Lettres.

Professor Hasenohr continues to publish careful studies of Latin and French manuscripts, with expertise in medieval philology, paleography, French literature, Christian spirituality, and women's writing.

Selected bibliography

"A propos de la Vie de Nostre Benoit Saulveur Jhesus Crist." Romania 102 (1981): 352-391.

"Abréviations et frontières de mots." Langue Française 119, Segments graphiques du français: Pratiques et normalisations dans l'histoire (September 1998): 24-29.

"Les anciennes traductions italiennes du De civitate dei". Thesis, 1968.

"Aperçu sur la diffusion et la réception de la littérature de spiritualité en langue française au dernier siècle du Moyen Age," Wissenorganisierende und wissensvermittelnde Literatur im Mittelalter, ed. Norbert Richard Wolf (Wiesbaden: Reichert, 1987), 57-90.

"Aspects de la littérature de spiritualité en langue française, 1480-1520." Revue de l'histoire de l'église en France 77 (1991): 29-45.

"Bible française." In Dictionnaire des lettres françaises. Le Moyen Âge (1992) p. 179-196.

"Bibles et psautiers." In Mise en page et mise en texte du livre manuscrit (1990) p. 316-327.

"Le christianisme méridional au miroir de sa littérature (XIIIe-XIVe siècles)." Heresis 11 (1988): 29-40.

"Copistes italiens du Lancelot: le manuscrit fr. 354 de la Bibl. Nationale." In Lancelot, Lanzelet. Hier et aujourdhui (1995) p. 219-226.

"Le Credo apostolique dans la littérature française du Moyen Âge." In Pensée, image et communication en Europe médiévale (1993) p. 175-178.

Culture et travail intellectuel dans l'occident médiéval: bilan des "Colloques d'humanisme médiéval (1960-1980) fondés par le R.P. Hubert, O.P., ed. Geneviève Hasenohr-Esnos and Jean Longère. Paris: Centre national de la recherche scientifique, 1981.

Le Cur Deus homo d'Anselme de Canterbury et le De arrha animae de Hugues de Saint-Victor, ed. Pierre Crapillet; Geneviève Hasenohr; Robert Bultot. Louvain-la-Neuve: Institut d'études médiévales de l'Université catholique de Louvain, 1984.

"De l'écriture à la lecture: réflexion sur les manuscrits d'Erec et Enide. In Les Manuscrits de Chrétien de Troyes ed. Françoise Gasparri and Christine Ruby (1993) Pt. 1, p. 97-148.

"Deux chansons franciscaines françaises du XIIIe siècle." Revista portuguesa de história do livro 10 (2007) p. 35-69.

Dictionnaire des lettres françaises volume 1, Le moyen âge, by Georges François-Xavier Marie Grente, Robert Bossuat, Louis Pichard, and Guy Raynaud de Lage. Revised by Michel Zink and Geneviève Hasenohr-Esnos. Paris: Le Livre de Poche / Fayard, 1992. Also 1994 edition "Ed. entièrement revue et mise à jour sous la dir. de Geneviève Hasenohr."

"Dire la verité", "oir la verité": quelle vérité ? À propos de quelques occurrences de vérité relevées dans les sermons de Gerson." La transmission des savoirs au Moyen Âge et à la Renaissance 1 (2005) p. 13-28.

"Discours vernaculaire et autorités latines. In Mise en page et mise en texte du livre manuscrit (1990) p. 289-315.

"Le dit de l'arbre." In Ensi firent li ancessor : mélanges de philologie médiévale offerts à Marc-René Jung (Alessandria : Edizioni dell'Orso, 1996) p. 559-572.

"Un Donat de dévotion en langue d'oc du XIIIe siècle: le Liber divini amoris." Eglise et culture en France méridionale, ed. Jacques Monfrin (2000) p. 219-243.

"Du bon usage de la galette des rois." Romania 114 (1996) p. 445-467.

"D’une « poésie de béguine » à une « poétique des béguines ». Aperçus sur la forme et la reception des textes (France, XIIIe-XIVe s.)." Comptes rendus des séances de l'Académie des Inscriptions et Belles Lettres 150 (2006) p. 913-943.

"Écrire en latin, ecrire en roman: réflexions sur la pratique des abréviations dans les manuscrits francais des XIIe et XIIIe siècles." In Langages et peuples d'Europe (2002) p. 79-110.

"Écrits moraux et lectures religieuses à la fin du Moyen âge: étude et édition de quelques textes en langue vernaculaire." Thesis, 1985.

"En Auvergne au XVe siècle: le chanoine Roger Benoiton et ses livres." In Mélanges André Vernet, ed. Anne-Marie Chagny-Sève (1998) p. 421-466.

Un enseignement de vie chrétienne du XIII siècle et sa postérité: la "Regle des coeurs ordonnés." Romania 124.3 (2006) p. 324-360.

"L'essor des bibliothèques privées aux XIVe et XVe siècles." Histoire des Bibliothèques françaises 1 (1989) p. 215-263.

Études de lexicologie et dialectologie ed. ; Nelly Andrieux-Reix; Geneviève Hasenohr-Esnos. Paris: Conseil international de la langue française, 1995.

"Un exemple d'accommodation linguistique au début du XVIe siècle." In Les formes du sens : études de linguistique française, médiévale et générale offertes à Robert Martin à l'occasion de ses 60 ans (Louvain: Duculot, 1997) p. 167-174.

"Une exposition 'humaniste' du Pater en langue d'oïl du XIIIe siècle. In Religion et mentalités au Moyen Âge : mélanges en l'honneur d'Hervé Martin. (Presses Universitaires de Rennes, 2003) p. 271-281.

"Un faux Pierre de Luxembourg, un vrai Arnoul de Bohéries un Isidore travesti dans la bibliothèque de Marguerite d'York." In Miscellanea in memoriam Pierre Cockshaw (1938-2008) : aspects de la vie culturelle dans les Pays-Bas méridionaux (XIVe-XVIIIe siècle) = aspecten van het culturele leven in de Zuidelijke Nederlanden (14de-18de eeuw) (Bruxelles : Archives et Bibliothèques de Belgique, 2009.2009) p. 175-193.

"Gace de La Bigne, maître chapelain de trois rois de France." In Mélanges Félix Lecoy (1973) p. 181-192.

Introduction à l'ancien français, by Guy Raynaud de Lage, revised by Geneviève Hasenohr.

"Isidore de Séville, auteur ascétique 'français'?" Romania vol. 128 (2010) p. 299-351 and vol. 129 (2011) p. 23-56.

"'Lacrimae pondera vocis habent': Typologie des larmes dans la littérature de spiritualité française des XIIIe-XVe siècles." Le Moyen Français 37.1 (2009): 45-63.

Les langues du sud: entre érosion et émergence, ed. Geneviève Hasenohr-Esnos. Congrès national des sociétés historiques et scientifiques, Toulouse, 2001. Paris: Comité des travaux historiques et scientifiques, 2004. .

Lettres communes, by Pope Urban 5, Tome 3, fasc. 2, ed. Pierre Botineau, Danielle Gaborit, Nicole Gotteri, Geneviève Hasenohr, Anne-Marie Hayez, Chantal Reydellet et François-Charles Uginet ; sous la dir. de Michel Hayez. École française de Rome (Rome), 1976. Bibliothèque des Ecoles françaises d'Athènes et de Rome. 3e série, Lettres communes des papes du 14e siècle num. 5 bis, p. 383-672.

"La littérature religieuse." La littérature française aux XIVe et XVe siècles. Grundriss der romanischen Literaturen des Mittelalters. Heidelberg: Carl Winter, 1988. 266-305.

"La locution verbale figure dans l'oeuvre de Jean Le Fèvre." Le Moyen français 14/15 (1984) p. 229-281

"Un manuscrit autographe de l'"Instruction de la vie mortelle" de Jean Baudouin de Rosiéres-aux-Salines." Romania 104 (1983) p. 257-260.

"Méditation méthodique et mnemonique: un témoignage figuré ancien (XIIIe - XIVe siècles)." In Mélanges Jacques Stiennon (1982) p. 365-382.

"Modèles de vie féminine dans la littérature morale et religieuse d'oc." In La femme dans la vie religieuse du Languedoc (1986) p. 153-170.

"Note sur un fragment de la Naissance du chevalier au cygne (Beatrix)" Romania 115 (1997) p. 250-258.

"Note sur un lexique technique monolingue de la fin du XVe siècle." Romania 105 (1984) p. 114-129.

"Note sur une ancienne traduction lorraine (XIIe siècle ?) du Benjamin minor." Revue d'histoire des textes 21 (1991) p. 237-242.

"Note sur une traduction française de la Règle de Saint Benoît à Saint-Germain-des-Prés (14.-16. siècles)." Le livre et l'historien: études offertes en l'honneur du professeur Henri-Jean Martin, ed. Frédéric Barbier, et al. (date?) p. 25-39.

"Un nouveau témoignage de la concurrence entre futur II et subjonctif imparfait en moyen français." In Mélanges Jacques Chaurand (1995) p. 43-48.Œuvres complètes de Marguerite de Navarre, vol. 4, Théâtre, ed. Nicole Cazauran, "édition critique établie, présentée et annotée par Geneviève Hasenohr et Olivier Millet." Paris: Honoré Champion, 2002.

"Les origines monastiques. Le rythme et la versification. Les chansons de geste. Les romans en vers." In Mise en page et mise en texte du livre manuscrit (1990) p. 231-243.

"Les prologues des textes de dévotion en langue française (XIIIe-XVe siècles): formes et fonctions." In Les prologues médiévaux (2000) p. 593-638.

"Un recueil inédit de lettres de direction spirituelle du XVe siècle : le manuscrit Vat. lat. 11259 de la Bibliothèque Vaticane." Mélanges d'archéologie et d'histoire  82.1 (1970) p. 401-500.

"Les recueils littéraires français du XIIIe siècle: public et finalité." In Codices Miscellanearum (Brussels: Van Hulthem Colloquium, 1999)  p. 37-50.

"Les recueils lyriques. Les manuscrits théâtraux. Vers une nouvelle esthétique." In Mise en page et mise en texte du livre manuscrit (Paris : Editions du Cercle de la librairie-Promodis, 1990) p. 329-352.

"Le respit de la mort par Jean Le Fèvre," Thesis by Geneviève Hasenohr-Esnos. Paris: A. and J. Picard, 1969. Summary.

“Retour sur les caractères linguistiques du manuscrit de Chantilly et de ses ancêtres” (avec 8 pages de corrections à l'édition Guarnieri/Verdeyen). In Marguerite Porete et le “Miroir des simples âmes”: Perspectives historiques, philosophiques et littéraires, ed. Sean L., Field, Robert E. Lerner, and Sylvain Piron, Paris: Vrin, 2014. p. 103-126. .Pages manuscrites de la littérature médiévale. By Geneviève Hasenohr and Michel Zink. Paris: Librairie Générale Française / Le Livre de Poche, 1999.Paléographie du Moyen Âge. By Jacques Stiennon and Geneviève Hasenohr-Esnos. Paris: Armand Colin, 1973 and 1982 and 1991.

"Une Passion provençale inédite du XIVe siècle." In Mélanges Jean Duvernoy (2005) p. 207-231.Pierre Crapillet, recteur de l'Hôpital du Saint-Esprit de Dijon. Louvain-la-Neuve: Institut d'études médiévales de l'Université catholique de Louvain, 1984.

"Place et rôle des traductions dans la pastorale française du XVe siècle." In Traduction et traducteurs au Moyen Age, ed. Geneviève Contamine. Paris: Editions du CNRS, 1989. 265-275.

"La prédication aux fidéles dans la première moitié du XIIe siècle: l'enseignement des sermons "'limousins'." Romania 116 (1998): 34-71.

"La prose." In Mise en page et mise en texte du livre manuscrit (1990) p. 264-271.

Quelques opuscules spirituels du XIIIe siècle en langue d'oc (ms. Egerton 945)." In Mélanges Nicole Cazauran (2002) p. 493-509.

"Un recueil de "distinctiones" bilingue du début du XIVe siècle: le manuscrit 99 de la Bibliothèque municipale de Charleville." Romania vol. 99 (1978) p. 47-96 and p. 183-206.

"Réflexions sur la genèse du Livre des oraisons." In Froissart à la cour de Béarn: l’écrivain, les arts et le pouvoir, ed. Valérie Fasseur. Series Texte, Codex & Contexte. Turnhout: Brepols, 2009, pages 223-247.  (Print) and 978-2-503-53889-1.

"Religious Reading Amongst the Laity in France in the Fifteenth Century." Heresy and Literacy, 1000-1530, ed. Peter Biller and Anne Hudson. Cambridge: Cambridge University Press, 1996. p. 205-221.

"Représentations et lectures de la Nativité à l'aube de la Renaissance." In Marguerite de Navarre 1492-1992. Actes du colloque international de Pau (Saint-Pierre-du-Mont, 1995) p. 365-401.

“La seconde vie du Miroir des simples âmes en France : Le Livre de la discipline d’amour (XVe-XVIIIe s.)” (avec édition d'extraits du Livre de la discipline d’amour). In Marguerite Porete et le “Miroir des simples âmes”: Perspectives historiques, philosophiques et littéraires, ed. Sean L., Field, Robert E. Lerner, and Sylvain Piron, Paris: Vrin, 2014. p. 263-317. .

"Le sermon sur la passion de Jean Courtecuisse: étude de la tradition manuscrite et édition." Montréal: Éditions CERES, 1985. Le Moyen Français 16 (1985-1986): 7-114.

"Le "Stabat mater dolorosa": poésie et spiritualité aux derniers siècles du moyen âge." La Maison-Dieu 176 (1989) p. 81-115.

"Si 'de picart en franczoys': de l'ancien au moyen français." (source & date?) p. 145-152.

"La société ecclésiale selon le chancelier Gerson: Typologies et vocabulaire." In Pfaffen und Laien - ein mittelalterlicher Antagonismus? (1999) p. 209-234.

"Sur une ancienne traduction lorraine (XIIe s.?) du Beniamin minor." Revue d'histoire des textes 21 (1991): 237-242.

"Les systèmes de repérage textuel." In Mise en page et mise en texte du livre manuscrit (1990) p. 272-287/

"La tradition du Miroir des simples âmes au XVe siècle: de Marguerite Porète († 1310) à Marguerite de Navarre." Comptes rendus des séances de l'Académie des Inscriptions et Belles-Lettres 4 (1999): 1347-1366.Tradition du texte et tradition de l'image: à propos d'un programme d'illustration du Theodolet. Ghent: E. Story-Scientia, 1979.

"Les traductions françaises du Stabat mater dolorosa." Recherches Augustiniennes et patristiques 24 (January 1989) p. 241-355.

"Les traductions médiévales françaises et italiennes des Soliloques attribués à Saint-Augustin." Rome: Ecole Française de Rome; Paris: De Boccard, 1967.

"Les traductions romanes du Civitate Dei." Paris: Éditions du CNRS, 1975. Les traductions romanes du De Civitate Dei. I - La traduction italienne. Revue d'histoire des textes 5 (1975) p. 169-238.

"Traductions et littérature en langue vulgaire." Mise en page et mise en texte du livre manuscrit. VIII ed. Martin and Vezin. Paris, 1990, p. 229-352.

"Typologie spirituelle et morphologie lexicale. Remarques sur le vocabulaire français de la solitude (XIIe-XVe siècles)."  Cultura neolatina 62.3-4 (2002) p. 229-245.

"Variation régionale, réception des textes et localisation des témoins quelques remarques à propos d'un manuscrit occitan du premier quart du XIVe siècle. " In Les langues du Sud (2004) p. 43-50.

"Vie culturelle et vie spirituelle des hôpitaux bourguignons dans la seconde moitié du XVe siècle." Les sources littéraires et leurs publics dans l'espace bourguignon (XIVe-XVIe s.) : Recontres de Middelbourg/Bergen-op-Zoom (27 au 30 septembre 1990). 31.1 (Neuchâtel : Centre européen d'études bourguignonnes, 1991) : 93-100.

"La vie quotidienne de la femme vue par l'Église au bas Moyen Âge." Medium Aevum Quotidianum 4 (1984) p. 17-20.

"La vie quotidienne de la femme vue par l'Église: l'enseignement des "journées chrétiennes" de la fin du Moyen Age." In Frau und spätmittelalterlicher Alltag'' (Vienna: Österreichischen Akademie der Wissenschaften, 1986) p. 19-101.

References

Chevaliers of the Ordre des Palmes Académiques
1942 births
French medievalists
Women medievalists
Knights of the Ordre national du Mérite
French philologists
20th-century French historians
21st-century French historians
Living people
Women linguists
20th-century philologists
École Nationale des Chartes alumni
21st-century French women writers
20th-century French women writers
French women historians